Samrat Chaudhary alias Rakesh Kumar  is a politician and Member of Legislative Council from the Bharatiya Janata Party (BJP). He has also remained Member of Legislative Assembly and a minister in Government of Bihar in Rashtriya Janata Dal government. Chaudhary has been a former Vice President of BJP for the state of Bihar and currently elected for the second term as MLC in 2020 after his first term ended in 2019. In 2014 Samrat planned a split in Rashtriya Janata Dal by defecting thirteen MLAs as splinter group of the party. He later joined BJP.

Life
Chaudhary belongs to Koeri caste and he has been the OBC face of the BJP for a long time.
He was born on 16 November 1968 in Lakhanpur village of Munger. His mother's name is Parvati Devi and father's name is Shakuni Chaudhary. His ancestral village is in Lakhanpur in Tarapur block of Munger district. Samrat belongs to a family of politicians.  The father of Samrat, Mr. Shakuni Choudhury has been an MLA and MP seven times and mother Parvati Devi has been an MLA from Tarapur (Vidhan Sabha constituency). After school life, he received higher education from Madurai Kamaraj University.

Political career
Chaudhary entered active politics in 1990 and on 19 May 1999 he was sworn in as the Minister of Agriculture in the Bihar government. He contested from Parbatta (Vidhan Sabha constituency) in 2000 and 2010 and was elected MLA. In 2010, he was made the Chief Whip of the opposition party in the Bihar Legislative Assembly. On 2 June 2014, he was sworn in and took charge as Minister of Urban Development and Housing Department in the Government of Bihar. In 2018, he was made the vice president of Bihar Pradesh in the Bharatiya Janata Party. Before joining BJP he has remained associated with Rashtriya Janata Dal as well as Janata Dal (United). In 2020 Bihar Assembly election he was made star campaigner of National Democratic Alliance, meanwhile he was embroiled in a controversy on giving a controversial statement on Lalu Prasad Yadav's caste equation.

In 2021, Samrat was made Panchayati Raj minister in the expanded cabinet of Nitish Kumar from BJP quota. He has also served as Minister for Urban Development and Housing, Health in 2014 in Jitan Ram Manjhi Ministry and Minister of Metrology and Horticulture in 1999 in Rabri Devi Ministry.

Tenure as Panchayati Raj Minister
The tenure of Samrat Choudhary as Panchayati Raj minister was a blend of controversies and developmental steps taken by him under the jurisdictions of his ministry. In March 2021, he gained nationwide attention for getting embroiled in a strong argument with the speaker of Bihar Legislative Assembly, Vijay Kumar Sinha. The speaker was seeking his reply, on a question that arose by an MLA, regarding working of his department. Later, he apologized to the speaker for violation of the decorum of the house. The Panchayati Raj Ministry under him took several steps for promoting better organisational structure like recruitment of more staff in sanitation department as well as paving the way for safe disposal of dead carcasses of stray animals. The ministry under him also planned to seek the intra department supports of other ministerial departments.

He has been accused of charges related to undue influence or personation at an election and disobedience to order duly promulgated by public servant.

See also
Satyendra Narayan Kushwaha

References

Living people
1968 births
Rashtriya Janata Dal politicians
Janata Dal (United) politicians
Hindustani Awam Morcha politicians
Bharatiya Janata Party politicians from Bihar
Members of the Bihar Legislative Council
Leaders of the Opposition in the Bihar Legislative Council